The 2013–14 ETC Superliga was the 20th season of the Kosovo Basketball Superleague, also called ETC Superliga in its sponsored identity it's the highest professional basketball league in Kosovo.

The regular season started on 12 October 2013 and finished on 29 April 2014, after all teams had played 28 games. The 4 best ranked teams advanced to the play-off phase whilst KB Drita was relegated to the Liga e Parë e Kosoves ne Baskbetboll after finishing last in the league table.

The play-offs started on 1 May 2015 and finished on 14 May 2015, Sigal Prishtina won their 9th title by beating KB Peja 3:0 in a 3-game final.

Regular season 

|}

Playoffs 
Same as last year, the semi-finals were played in a best-of-four format.

Awards
MVP:  Dardan Berisha – Sigal Prishtina
Finals MVP:  Dardan Berisha – Sigal Prishtina
Foreigner MVP:  Frederick House – KB Peja
Coach of the Year:  Marin Dokuzovski – Sigal Prishtina

References 

Kosovo Basketball Superleague seasons
Kosovo
basketball